Nicolas Cousin (born 11 July 1985) is a retired French professional football player. He previously played for Angers SCO and Paris Saint-Germain at the professional level.

Coaching career
Cousin retired at the end of the 2018-19 season, having played 190 games for FC Chartres. He then returned to Paris Saint-Germain in a goalkeeper coaching role, working with the youth teams at the academy.

References

External links

1985 births
Living people
People from Nemours
French footballers
Association football goalkeepers
Angers SCO players
US Créteil-Lusitanos players
Ligue 2 players
CS Avion players
Footballers from Seine-et-Marne